Kudimahaan (transl. Drunk person) is a 2023 Indian Tamil-language dram comedy film directed by Prakash N. The film stars Vijay Sivan, Chandini Tamilarasan, Suresh Chakravarth, Sethu Raman and Namo Narayanan, Kathiravan, Honest Rajin supporting roles. It was released on 17 March 2023.

Cast 
 Vijay Sivan
 Chandini Tamilarasan
 Suresh Chakravarthy
 Sethu Raman
 Namo Narayanan
 Kathiravan
 Honest Raj

Production 
The first look poster of the movie was released in January by directors Vetrimaaran, Arunraja Kamaraj and Ponram. The film is produced by Scenario Media Works.

Reception 
The film was released on 17 March 2023 to highly positive reviews from critics and audience. Logesh Balachandran of Times of india gave 3.5 stars out of 5 and noted that "with the background score being a particular standout, except for one unnecessary song in the second half". Dinamalar critic stated that "The film would have attracted more attention if some actors of star status were cast." and gave 2.75 rating out of 5.Dina Thanthi critic wrote that "The effects of drinking could also have been emphatically displayed.".Maalai Malar critic gave 3 rating out of 5 and stated that "He has made the screenplay to make you laugh at some places and not to make you laugh at some places." Manigandan Kr critic from the south first wrote that "No big stars, no big comedians, and no big brands involved and yet, Kudimahaan is highly entertaining. It is worth your time and money.", Cinema Vikatan critic praised the writer and director for utilizing characters efficiently and invoked humor from them.

References

External links 
 

2020s Tamil-language films
2023 action drama films
Films about families